The 2000 Penn State Nittany Lions football team represented the Pennsylvania State University in the 2000 NCAA Division I-A football season. The team's head coach was Joe Paterno. It played its home games at Beaver Stadium in University Park, Pennsylvania.

Schedule
Penn State did not play Big Ten teams Northwestern and Wisconsin this year.

Roster

Rankings

Post season

NFL draft
Four Nittany Lions were drafted in the 2001 NFL Draft.

References

Penn State
Penn State Nittany Lions football seasons
Penn State Nittany Lions football